Buried by the Buzzzz is a 7" EP of remixes of "Buried By the Buzz" and "You Are the Daybreak" from Kevin Devine's album Split the Country, Split the Street, released on July 7, 2006. The record was pressed on 70gm clear vinyl with color labels, full color jacket, matte & gloss varnishes and hand numbered limited edition of 450.

Both of remixes are by Chris Bracco, who produced Split The Country, Split The Street along with Mike Skinner and Kevin Devine.

This vinyl is currently out-of-print. The remix of "Buried by the Buzzzz" is available to stream via the MySpace page for These Are Not Records.

Track list
 "Buried by the Buzzzz"
 "The Burst of Blood in My Chest"

References

Kevin Devine EPs
2006 EPs